Prasophyllum fecundum, commonly known as the self-pollinating leek orchid, is a species of orchid endemic to South Australia. It has a single, smooth, tube-shaped leaf with a reddish or purplish base, and up to twelve relatively small green and purplish flowers. The flowers are short-lived and self-pollinating although attractive to insects.

Description
The base of the leaf is red or purplish. As with others in the genus, the flowers are inverted so that the labellum is above the column rather than below it. The upturned part is triangular with a wavy edge. Flowering occurs in September and early October.

Taxonomy and naming
Prasophyllum fecundum was first formally described in 1989 by Robert Bates and the description was published in Journal of the Adelaide Botanic Garden from a specimen collected in the Sandy Creek Conservation Park. The specific epithet (fecundum) is a Latin word meaning "fruitful", "rich" or "abounding" referring to the size of the ovary, which is usually larger than the rest of the flower.

Distribution and habitat
The self-pollinating leek orchid usually grows in sandy soil, often with Callitris trees.  It is found on the Yorke Peninsula, the southern Eyre Peninsula and in the Barossa Valley. Although the flowers are self-pollinating, they are nevertheless scented and attractive to insects.

References

External links 
 

fecundum
Flora of South Australia
Plants described in 1989
Endemic orchids of Australia